Jean-Hugues Ateba Bilayi (born 1 April 1981) is a Cameroonian former professional footballer who played as a defender.

Born in Yaoundé, Ateba joined Nantes in 1997, coming from Cameroon where he played with Nassara and Brasseries du Cameroun. His debut for the first team came in the 2000–01 season. At the end of the 2003–04 season his contract came to an end, and he chose a transfer to Paris Saint-Germain. After only making 30 appearances in three years for PSG, Bilayi chose to move down to Ligue 2 with Châteauroux.

External links
 
 
 

Living people
1981 births
Association football defenders
Cameroonian footballers
Cameroon international footballers
Ligue 1 players
Ligue 2 players
FC Nantes players
Paris Saint-Germain F.C. players
LB Châteauroux players
Atromitos F.C. players
AC Boulogne-Billancourt players
Cameroonian expatriate footballers
Expatriate footballers in France
Expatriate footballers in Greece
Expatriate soccer players in Australia